The Rooney Rule is a National Football League policy that requires league teams to interview ethnic-minority candidates for head coaching and senior football operation jobs. It is an example of affirmative action, even though before 2022 there was no hiring quota or hiring preference given to minorities, only an interviewing quota. The first actual hiring quota was established before the 2022 season, mandating that at least one member of each team's offensive coaching staff must be either an ethnic minority or a woman. The Rooney Rule was established in 2003, and variations of the rule are now in place in other industries.

History and origin

The rule is named after Dan Rooney, the former owner of the Pittsburgh Steelers and former chairman of the league's diversity committee.

It was created as a reaction to the 2002 firings of head coaches Tony Dungy of the Tampa Bay Buccaneers and Dennis Green of the Minnesota Vikings, at a time when Dungy had a winning record and Green had just had his first losing season in ten years. Shortly afterwards, U.S. civil rights attorneys Cyrus Mehri and Johnnie Cochran released a study showing that black head coaches, despite winning a higher percentage of games, were less likely to be hired and more likely to be fired than their white counterparts. Former NFL players Kellen Winslow and John Wooten then put together an affinity group of minority scouts, coaches, and front-office personnel, to advocate for the rule's creation. This rule was also heavily pressured by the NFL players, since most players in the NFL are African American.  

Its purpose was to ensure that minority coaches, especially African Americans, would be considered for high-level coaching positions. Fritz Pollard was the first minority head coach in NFL history (which was during the league's early years in the 1920s) and by the time the rule was implemented, only Tom Flores, Art Shell, Dennis Green, Ray Rhodes, Tony Dungy, and Herman Edwards had ever held head coaching jobs. (Only Dungy and Edwards were actively head coaching at the time of the rule's implementation, though Shell and Green would later return to head coaching.) Dungy in particular had struggled for years before getting a head coaching job; he was often promoted as a head coaching candidate by Chuck Noll when Dungy was an assistant under Noll in the 1980s with the Steelers, but he would not become a head coach until 1996 when he took over the Tampa Bay Buccaneers. Another former Steelers assistant, Marvin Lewis, also struggled to find a head coaching position despite immense success as the Baltimore Ravens defensive coordinator and would not find a head coaching position until being hired by the Cincinnati Bengals in 2003, the year the Rooney Rule went into effect.

Impact

Since the Rooney Rule was established, several NFL franchises have hired African-American head coaches, including the Steelers themselves, who hired Mike Tomlin before their 2007 season. (The Steelers, however, had already interviewed Ron Rivera, who is ethnically Hispanic, to fulfill the requirement before interviewing Tomlin, and Rooney himself contends that Tomlin's hiring did not result from the Rule.) At the start of the 2006 season, the overall percentage of African-American coaches had jumped to 22%, up from 6% prior to the Rooney Rule.

For the 2019 season, eight NFL teams had head coaching vacancies to fill. However, only one team, the Miami Dolphins, hired a non-white coach, Brian Flores, who was then fired after three seasons (the final two of which were winning seasons).

, the NFL had three African-American head coaches, the same number as in 2003 when the Rooney Rule was adopted. Going into the 2022 season, the number of minority head coaches by NFL definition is six. Todd Bowles (Tampa Bay), Lovie Smith (Houston), and Mike Tomlin (Pittsburgh) are African-American; Ron Rivera (Washington) is Hispanic; Mike McDaniel (Miami) is multiracial; and Robert Saleh (New York Jets) is a Muslim of Lebanese origin.

Application

The rule does not apply if an assistant coach has language in his contract guaranteeing him the head coaching job in case of an opening. For example, this was the case when Mike Martz took over as head coach of the St. Louis Rams before the 2000 season.  Also, the requirement does not apply if the assistant coach taking over the head position is a minority, as was the case with Mike Singletary and the San Francisco 49ers in late 2008.

, Rooney Rule requirements apply to all searches for senior football operations positions within the NFL, regardless of a team's title for that position. It now also includes all ethnic minorities, not just African Americans.

, two of the 32 head coaches in the NFL are African-American, with one Hispanic head coach. Recently, some legal scholars have advocated for extending the Rooney Rule to college football, where the number of minority head coaches hovers around 6%, well below the 12.6%  of the total US population which is African-American.

Detroit Lions case, 2003

In 2003, the NFL fined the Detroit Lions $200,000 for failure to interview African-American candidates for the team's vacant head coaching job. After Marty Mornhinweg was fired, the Lions immediately hired former San Francisco 49ers head coach Steve Mariucci to replace him without interviewing any other candidates. The Lions claimed they attempted to interview other candidates but that the African-American candidates withdrew from interviews, believing Mariucci's hiring was inevitable. The Lions did not hire another minority head coach until hiring Jim Caldwell in 2014. Previously, minority Wayne Fontes was head coach of the team.

2012 controversial non-hirings and possible rule revision
In the wake of no minority hirings to fill eight head coaching and seven general management vacancies following the conclusion of the 2012 NFL regular season, NFL Executive Vice president of Human Resources Robert Gulliver stated, "While there has been full compliance with the interview requirements of the Rooney Rule and we wish the new head coaches and general managers much success, the hiring results this year have been unexpected and reflect a disappointing lack of diversity." Analysts have pointed to the lack of interview offers for Baltimore Ravens' Offensive coordinator Jim Caldwell, who, as head coach, led the Indianapolis Colts to a 14–2 2009 season along with winning the 2009 American Football Conference title before losing in Super Bowl XLIV, as evidence that the rule needs revision. Some sports analysts have called upon the NFL to modify the Rooney Rule by requiring NFL teams to interview a minority candidate outside their respective organizations, and extending the rule to include interviews for offensive and defensive coordinators.

2020 Controversy 
In recent years, the trend of hiring head coaches in the NFL has shifted towards looking for successful offensive coordinators; a role in which minorities only hold two out of the 32 available positions. In 2020, five NFL teams had head coaching vacancies to fill, and only one of them hired a non-white coach. These five teams were criticized for passing on Eric Bieniemy, the offensive coordinator for the Super Bowl champion Kansas City Chiefs. Under Bieniemy, the Kansas City Chiefs had the league's top-ranked offense in the 2018 season, and the 5th ranked offense in 2019.

The 2020 NFL offseason led to many figures questioning the effectiveness of this rule due to Bieniemy not receiving serious consideration for a head coaching position and other such controversies since the rule's inception. To fulfill the requirements of this rule, many teams interview non-white coaches that have been around the league for years and have had previously unsuccessful stints as head coaches, such as Marvin Lewis. Critics of the rule argue that the rule has been largely ineffective, and in some situations, it has even had the opposite effect; with non-white coaches being interviewed without being given serious consideration just to fulfill the requirement.

In May 2020 the NFL increased the requirements of the Rooney rule to require two external minority candidate interviews, rather than one, for head coaching jobs. In addition, teams must now interview at least one minority candidate for all coordinator positions. Also, teams and the NFL league office must also interview at least one minority candidate for senior-level positions, including general manager and club president jobs. Finally, for at least some positions, women may be interviewed to satisfy the requirement.

2020 Resolution JC-2A
In November 2020, the NFL passed 2020 Resolution JC-2A, which rewards teams for developing minority candidates for head coach and/or GM positions. The resolution rewards teams whose minority candidates are hired away for one of those positions by awarding third-round draft picks, similar to the system for compensatory draft picks. For example, the first team to receive such picks, the Los Angeles Rams, received third-round picks in 2021 and 2022 after the Detroit Lions hired their director of college scouting, Brad Holmes, as their general manager.

An earlier version of the resolution would have rewarded teams for hiring minority candidates rather than for developing them.

2022 Brian Flores lawsuit
On February 1, 2022, former Miami Dolphins head coach Brian Flores sued the NFL, the Dolphins, the New York Giants, and the Denver Broncos, alleging racism, violations of federal employment law, and that his interviews were a sham meant solely to fulfill the Rooney Rule.

Further changes in 2022 
On March 28, 2022, the NFL announced that it had made further changes to the Rooney Rule. First, starting with the 2022 season, all teams are required to have at least one minority on their offensive coaching staff. Minority group members already serving in such roles count toward compliance with this new provision, intended to increase the number of minorities in the pool of offensive coaches, which had produced the most sought-after candidates for head coaching positions in recent years. Coaches hired under this provision will be paid at least in part from a league-wide fund set aside for this purpose.

For the first time, the definition of "minority" for purposes of the Rooney Rule was fully extended to include women, regardless of their racial or ethnic background. While teams are not required to interview women for coaching positions, women will count toward all required interviewing quotas.

Outside the NFL
In association football (soccer), players' representatives have been campaigning for a similar practice in England. Gordon Taylor, Chief Executive of the PFA (the players' trade union) said in September 2014 the sport "has a 'hidden resistance' preventing black managers getting jobs," pointing out that "you see so many black players on the pitch, yet we have two black managers out of 92." Garth Crooks, a prominent black former player, was especially scathing of the failure of The Football League (a large association of clubs below the top-tier Premier League) to pursue the matter, suggesting the league lacked courage. Black coaches Kieron Dyer and Titus Bramble spoke out against the idea of Rooney Rule, saying they did not want to be perceived as having their roles because of a "quota".  On January 9, 2018, it was reported that the England national football team would implement the Rooney Rule for all future interviews for the manager position.

On August 2, 2020, the West Coast Conference (WCC), an NCAA Division I league, announced that it had adopted a similar policy effective immediately, calling its initiative the Russell Rule after Basketball Hall of Famer Bill Russell, who played in college at charter and current WCC member San Francisco. The WCC became the first Division I conference to establish such a policy. According to the WCC,

Outside sports 
Some companies outside of sports, such as Pinterest, Facebook, Patreon and Checkr, have put similar rules in place for their hiring processes.  In general, the Rooney rule in these companies focuses on the diversity of the applicants in the pipeline for a particular position; the rule requires pausing at some stage of the hiring process until some diversity benchmark has been reached for the pool of applicants at that stage.  Inspired by the Rooney Rule, Diversity Lab created the Mansfield Rule in 2017, which is named after the first woman admitted to the practice of law in the U.S., Arabella Mansfield. The Mansfield Rule measures whether law firms have affirmatively considered (at least 30 percent of the candidate pool) historically underrepresented lawyers for leadership and governance roles, equity partner promotions, and lateral positions.

References

Affirmative action in the United States
Recruitment